Gościejewo may refer to the following places:
Gościejewo, Greater Poland Voivodeship (west-central Poland)
Gościejewo, Masovian Voivodeship (east-central Poland)
Gościejewo, West Pomeranian Voivodeship (north-west Poland)